Pia Sørensen (born 14 June 1967) is a Danish swimmer. She competed in four events at the 1988 Summer Olympics.

References

External links
 

1967 births
Living people
Danish female swimmers
Olympic swimmers of Denmark
Swimmers at the 1988 Summer Olympics
People from Hillerød Municipality
Sportspeople from the Capital Region of Denmark